Henry's Crime is a 2010 American romantic comedy crime film directed by Malcolm Venville and starring Keanu Reeves, Vera Farmiga, and James Caan. The film follows Henry (Reeves), who goes to jail for a bank robbery he did not commit. Once released, he plans to rob the same bank with his former cellmate Max (Caan). The film premiered at the Toronto International Film Festival on September 14, 2010, and was given a limited release in the United States on April 8, 2011.

Plot
Working the night shift as a toll collector on a lonely stretch of highway in Buffalo, New York, Henry is a man seemingly without ambition, dreams or purpose; a man sleepwalking his way through life. His wife Debbie is not happy with the situation.

One morning Eddie, a friend, drops by to ask Henry to play in a baseball game, as one of the others is ill, and Henry agrees to. As they drive to the game in Henry's car, Eddie asks Henry to stop at an ATM. But Eddie, and two acquaintances also in the car, instead rob the Buffalo Savings Bank, and Henry is arrested as an accomplice.

Rather than give up the names of the real culprits, Henry takes the fall and goes to jail. There his cellmate is the irrepressible Max, a conman who has grown far too comfortable with the familiarity and security of his "idyllic" life behind bars, but one who also helps plant an idea in Henry's mind which will change his life forever: for a man to find his purpose, he must first have a dream. Debbie decides to divorce him, and she marries Joe, one of the men who carried out the robbery.

Upon his release eighteen months later, Henry finds his purpose. Having done his time, he decides he might as well do the crime. Discovering a long forgotten bootlegger's tunnel which runs from the very same bank to a theater across the alleyway, he convinces the reluctant Max to file for his long overdue parole – to help stage a robbery of the bank.

Max encourages Henry to become an actor in the theater's current production of Anton Chekhov's 1904 play The Cherry Orchard, to assist Max, "volunteering" to work in the theater, in getting access to the tunnel. Meanwhile, Henry finds himself falling for the production's mercurial leading lady, Julie.

Debbie's husband Joe is recruited to help clearing the tunnel of mud; he informs Eddie, who insists on participating too. Frank, a guard at the bank forced into retirement, helps by informing the robbers when there is a lot of money in the vault. During the actual robbery, Eddie uses a gun to try to take all the money himself, but is overpowered by Max and is left behind in the vault. As the three make their escape, Henry demands Joe stop the car. Henry wishes Max well, and he then returns to Julie.

Cast

 Keanu Reeves as Henry Torne
 James Caan as Max Saltzman
 Vera Farmiga as Julie Ivanova
 Judy Greer as Debbie Torne
 Fisher Stevens as Eddie Vibes
 Peter Stormare as Darek Millodragovic
 Bill Duke as Frank
 Danny Hoch as Joe
 Currie Graham as Simon
 David Costabile as Arnold

Production

Development
Malcolm Venville directed the film from a screenplay written by Sacha Gervasi and David N. White. The screenplay was adapted from a story by Gervasi and Stephen Hamel. Hamel produced the picture alongside Jordan Schur and David Mimran through their company Mimran Schur Pictures, and Lemore Syvan and Keanu Reeves through the production company Films.

Casting
In August 2009, it was announced that Keanu Reeves had joined the cast and would be producing the project. In October 2009, Variety reported that Vera Farmiga and James Caan had also joined the project in main roles.

Filming
Principal photography for the project took place in Buffalo, New York, Queens, New York City, and Tarrytown, New York. Production started in December 2009 and was completed in January 2010. Filming also took place in Nassau County Corrections Facility in East Meadow, New York.

Release

Box office
Henry's Crime ranked #75 in its opening weekend taking $8,726 from two theaters. The film went on to make $102,541 in the United States and $2,062,820 in foreign markets, for a worldwide total gross of $2,165,361.

Critical response
The film received mixed reviews from film critics. , Henry's Crime holds a 41% approval rating on Rotten Tomatoes, based on 54 reviews with an average score of 5.07 out of 10. The site's critical consensus reads, "Supporting actors Vera Farmiga and James Caan give the movie a little heft, but Henry's Crime is an otherwise predictable heist/comedy with slow pacing." On Metacritic, the film has a score of 49 out of 100, based on 19 critics, indicating "mixed or average reviews".

Lisa Schwarzbaum of Entertainment Weekly gave the film a C grade, and wrote, "This picaresque caper might do well as a novel, but as a movie – assembled with no consistent sense of moviemaking, each performer left to his or her own actorly whims – it's a grab bag of comic clichés about bank robberies and regional theater." Film critic Roger Ebert wrote, "Reeves has many arrows in his quiver, but screwball comedy isn't one of them. Vera Farmiga, James Caan and Fisher Stevens can do it, but they often seem to be looking back, waiting for Reeves to pass the baton. What's needed is someone nervous to play Henry. A Steve Buscemi for example. Reeves maintains a sort of Zen detachment. Whatever happens is all right with him."

References

External links
 
 
 
 
 

2010 films
2010s crime comedy-drama films
American crime comedy-drama films
American heist films
American independent films
Films about bank robbery
Films set in New York (state)
Films shot in Buffalo, New York
Films shot in New York City
2010 independent films
2010s English-language films
Films directed by Malcolm Venville
2010s American films